Dedebakırı is a village in the Baykan District of Siirt Province in Turkey. The village is populated by Kurds of the Babosî and Çirî tribes and had a population of 276 in 2021.

References 

Kurdish settlements in Siirt Province
Villages in Baykan District